The Theban Tomb TT67 is located in Sheikh Abd el-Qurna. It forms part of the Theban Necropolis, situated on the west bank of the Nile opposite Luxor. The tomb is the burial place of the ancient Egyptian official Hapuseneb, who was High Priest of Amun during the New Kingdom reign of Hatshepsut.

In the passage of the tomb, Hapuseneb's parents are mentioned. His father Hepu was Third lector of Amun. His mother was called Ahhotep. Hapuseneb's wife Amenhotep is known from inscriptions in Gebel el-Silsila, but she is not mentioned in his tomb.

See also
 List of Theban tombs
 N. de Garis Davies, Nina and Norman de Garis Davies, Egyptologists

References

External links

 High Priests of Amun
 Scans of Norman and Nina De Garis Davies' tracings from Theban Tomb 67

Theban tombs